Lee Joo-heon is a South Korean rapper, songwriter, and producer, also known by the stage name Joohoney. He is a member of the South Korean boy group Monsta X, as well as a credited writer on the majority of their discography. He is also a credited writer and producer for his solo works. Joohoney had also written and produced works for other artists and groups, including label mates Mad Clown, Cravity, and group mates Minhyuk and Hyungwon solo works. As of January 2023, he had a total of 154 song credits for writing and producing through the Korea Music Copyright Association (KOMCA).

Prior to his debut, Joohoney began writing songs, mostly with other artists on his label Starship Entertainment. He wrote for the boy group Boyfriend and the girl group C-REAL prior to his debut. He again worked with Boyfriend several years later in 2017, for their sixth EP Never End, writing their lead single, the tropical pop song "Star", alongside Jeongmin of Boyfriend. He also produced their song "Falling". Both prior to his debut and after joining Monsta X, he collaborated with the rapper Mad Clown, writing lyrics for Mad Clown's work and for the collaborative songs they released. His early style was recognized for its witty lyrics and tight rap, which showed an aggressive style.

Since Monsta X's debut in 2015, Joohoney had been involved in songwriting for the group's discography, primarily in writing his raps for all of their albums, as well as more extensive writing and producing for several of their tracks, garnering praise for his unique musicality. Onto Monsta X's 2020 EP Fantasia X, beyond writing his raps for the album, the two tracks which he wrote and produced, "Flow" and "Stand Up", were noted for how they stood as two opposing songs on the EP, a self-reflective track and a bright cheery song with an optimistic message. They were both noted for showing the softer side of Joohoney's usually aggressive music style, reflecting his versatility as an artist.

In 2020, Joohoney wrote and produced "Jumper" for Cravity's debut EP Season 1. Hideout: Remember Who We Are, which brought wider coverage and attention to the new group's debut. They also had the highest album sales of newly debuted artists for the first half of 2020. For their EP One of a Kind, released in 2021, Joohoney was a credited producer on Monsta X's title track for the first time, previously only have written lyrics for their title tracks.

Songs
All credits are adapted from the KOMCA, unless stated otherwise.

2011-2014

2015

2016

2017

2018

2019

2020

2021

2022

2023

References

Lee Joo-heon, List of songs written by